Paradise Center in Sofia, Bulgaria is the largest mall in Bulgaria. It opened doors on 28 March 2013. The main investors are Bulfeld, Sofia and construction company Comfort, Varna. The building is located in Hladilnika neighbourhood near the South Park. The infrastructure in the area is currently being upgraded by expanding of several boulevards and the metro system. Vitosha Metro Station of Sofia Metro line 2 has been servicing the shopping mall since July 2016.

Overview
The mall is located in a heavily populated part of the city, construction has since caused congestion to increase considerably in the immediate vicinity. The mall is one of the biggest in the country and the whole Central and Eastern Europe.

Zones
Paradise Center has four zones in terms of interior design – the boulevard, the canyon, the terrace and the garden differentiating from each other with diverse concept and style.

 The core of the project is a natural Garden with two waterfalls and a lake with a bridge. Located in the central atrium, the garden is illuminated with natural light. The panoramic elevator there connects the ground level with the other floors.
 The Boulevard in Paradise Center is in the form of a high street with a sidewalks, trees, small and large fashion stores, banks, pharmacies, jewelry and gift stores.
 The Canyon and the Terrace employ their own specific architectures.
 The second floor is the entertainment floor. A multiplex with 14 halls of the international brand Cinema City International an ice rink and four restaurants with panoramic terraces together with a fast food area.
 The last, third floor, accommodates a fitness, SPA center, squash and tennis halls. Some restaurants and bars are placed there.
 There is a theme park on the roof terrace.

See also
 List of the world's largest shopping malls
 List of shopping malls in Sofia
 Capital Fort and Mall of Sofia, examples of other big construction projects in Sofia

References

External links
 English presentation of official website

Shopping malls in Sofia
Commercial buildings completed in 2013
Shopping malls established in 2013
2013 establishments in Bulgaria